Romain Sazy (born 14 October 1986) is a French professional rugby union player. He currently plays at lock for La Rochelle in the Top 14.

References

External links
 La Rochelle profile

Living people
1986 births
French rugby union players
Rugby union locks
Stade Rochelais players
Sportspeople from Tarn-et-Garonne